SGDS may refer to:

Association des Scouts et Guides du Senegal, one of Senegal's Scouting and Guiding organizations.
Spontaneous Genome Degeneration Syndrome, a fictional and deadly man-made virus, in the Soldiers of Anarchy video game.
Succinylglutamate desuccinylase, an enzyme that catalyzes a chemical reaction.

See also
SGD (disambiguation)

Disambiguation pages